Mameluk was one of seven s built for the French Navy in the first decade of the twentieth century.

Design and description

The Spahi class was over 50 percent larger than the preceding  to match the increase in size of foreign destroyers. The ships displaced  at deep load. Their crew numbered 77–79 officers and men.

Mameluk was powered by two triple-expansion steam engines, each driving one propeller shaft using steam provided by four du Temple boilers.

The primary armament of the Spahi-class ships consisted of six  Modèle 1902 guns in single mounts, one each fore and aft of the superstructure and the others were distributed amidships. They were also fitted with three  torpedo tubes. One of these was in a fixed mount in the bow and the other two were on single rotating mounts amidships.

Construction and career
Mameluk was ordered from Ateliers et Chantiers de la Loire and was launched at their shipyard in Nantes on 13 March 1908. She was completed in June 1911.

Tasked with escort duties in the Mediterranean Mameluk was assigned to the 1st Squadron in June 1911, and a year later she was assigned to the 2nd Destroyer Squadron, of the 1st Fleet. In March 1913 she was assigned to torpedo squadron patrols and to support submarines in the Adriatic.

During World War I, Mameluk rammed the French destroyer  in the Ionian Sea on 5 June 1915, so badly damaging Fantassin that the French destroyer  consequently scuttled her.

In 1916, Mameluk escorted the submarines Faraday and Le Verrier to Milo.

Mameluk was sold for scrap in 1928.

Citations

Bibliography

 
 

Spahi-class destroyers
World War I destroyers of France
Maritime incidents in 1915
Ships built in France
1909 ships